Seth O'Byrne is a California real estate broker in San Diego, California with Compass who stars on HGTV's television series Hot Properties San Diego.

Early life  
O'Byrne attended the University of San Diego.

Career

Real estate 
Seth O'Byrne began selling homes in 2002 while he was a third year at the University of San Diego. He was a finalist for "40 Under 40" by the San Diego Business Journal, Realtor of the Year in 2017, and "50 Most Influential Business Leaders in San Diego."

Television 
O'Byrne stars on HGTV's Hot Properties San Diego along with co-stars Mia Tidwell and Andrew White.  HGTV aired a total of 9 episodes.

In addition to HGTV, O'Byrne has also appeared on FOX, CBS, Amazon, and Apple TV.

References 

Living people
Year of birth missing (living people)